Polymerization-induced phase separation (PIPS) is the occurrence of phase separation in a multicomponent mixture induced by the polymerization of one or more components. The increase in molecular weight of the reactive component renders one or more components to be mutually immiscible in one another, resulting in spontaneous phase segregation.

Types 

Polymerization-induced phase separation can be initiated either through thermally induced polymerization or photopolymerization. The process general occurs through spinodal decomposition, commonly resulting in the formation of co-continuous phases.

Control over morphology 

The morphology of the final phase separated structures are generally random owing to the stochastic nature of the onset and process of phase separation. Several approaches have been investigated to control morphology. Tran-Cong-Miyata and co-workers using periodic irradiation in photoreactive polymer blends to control morphology, specifically width of the resultant spinodal modes in the phase separated morphology. Li and co-workers employed holography, a process of holographic polymerization, in to order to direct the phase separated structure to have the same patterns as the holographic field. Recently, Hosein and co-workers demonstrated that nonlinear optical pattern formations that occur in photopolymer systems may be used to direct the organization of blends to have the same morphology as the light pattern.

Applications 
The process is commonly used in control of the morphology of polymer blends, for applications in thermoelectrics, solid-state lighting, polymer electrolytes, composites, membrane formation, and surface pattern formations.

References 

__notoc__
Polymer chemistry